Jovian is the adjectival form of Jupiter and may refer to:
 Jovian (emperor) (Flavius Iovianus Augustus), Roman emperor (363–364 AD)
 Jovians and Herculians, Roman imperial guard corps
 Jovian (lemur), a Coquerel's sifaka known for Zoboomafoo
 Jovian (fiction), a hypothetical or fictional native inhabitant of the planet Jupiter
 Jovian planet or giant planet, any large gaseous planet
 Jovians, a non-playable race in Eve Online

See also 
 Iovianus Pontanus (Giovanni Pontano), an Italian humanist poet
 Jovian Chronicles, a science-fiction game
 Jovian–Plutonian gravitational effect, an April Fools' Day hoax
 Jovian system, the system of Jupiter's moons
 Joviânia, a small town in Brazil
 Jupiter
 Jupiter (mythology)